Natasha Rath Marcus (born April 27, 1969) is a Democratic member of the North Carolina General Assembly representing the state's 41st Senate district.

Biography
Marcus earned her bachelor's degree in public policy from Hamilton College and her Juris Doctor degree from Duke University School of Law.

In 2014, Marcus ran unsuccessfully for the North Carolina House of Representatives. Marcus won the election on 6 November 2018 as a member of the Democratic Party. She secured fifty-seven percent of the vote while her closest rival long-time Republican senator Jeff Tarte secured forty-three percent. During her tenure, Marcus has pushed to expand access to reproductive healthcare in North Carolina, and signed on in 2021 to the proposed "RBG Act".

References

Democratic Party North Carolina state senators
Living people
21st-century American politicians
21st-century American women politicians
Women state legislators in North Carolina
1969 births